Jinchuan Group Ltd. (Chinese: 金川集团) is a Chinese company based in Gansu. It produces the metals nickel, copper, cobalt, platinum, palladium, gold, silver and selenium. As of 2007 it has the capacity to produce 150,000 metric tons of refined nickel per year, producing 90% of China's output, and is the largest nickel producer in Asia. It produces 400,000 tons of copper per year, the fourth largest in China. The company reported that it would make a profit of 10 billion yuan in 2007 compared with 7.2 billion yuan in 2006, with sales of 50 billion yuan.

In October 2007, it was reported that it was planning to raise 30 billion yuan in an IPO some time in the next 10 months.

In 2011, Jinchuan outbid Vale S.A. in seeking to buy the mining company Metorex for $1.32 billion. This bid was successful, and Metorex became a subsidiary in early 2012.

The Jinchuan Group is a majority (60.01%) shareholder of Jinchuan Group International Resources Co., which is publicly traded on the Hong Kong stock market. As of December 2021, the group was considering taking this company private.

References

External links 
 Company website

Government-owned companies of China
Metal companies of China
Companies based in Gansu
Companies established in 1959